The Varanasi–Raebareli–Lucknow line (also known as Varanasi–Lucknow chord line) is a railway line connecting Varanasi and Lucknow, both in the Indian state of Uttar Pradesh. The line is under the administrative jurisdiction of Northern Railway.

History
The Lucknow–Rae Bareli extension was completed in 1893 and the Varanasi–Lucknow chord line via Rae Bareli was constructed in 1898.

Line doubling and electrification
As of 2013, the railways have taken up doubling of the  Utaratia–Raebareli sector and the  Raebareli–Amethi sector.  Work is in progress for electrification of the  Varanasi–Unchahar railway line.

New lines
Railways have taken up construction of the   Rae Bareli–Akbarganj–Faizabad new line and the  Unchahar-Amethi-Sultanpur–Kadipur new line in 2013.

Passenger movement
Varanasi and Lucknow on this line are amongst the top hundred booking stations of Indian Railway.

Sheds, workshops and manufacturing facilities
Lucknow diesel loco shed or Alambagh diesel shed is home to 160+ locomotives, including WDM-2, WDM-3A, WDM-3D, WDG-3A and WDG-4 varieties. Charbagh locomotive workshops handle periodical overhaul jobs.

Banaras Locomotive Works at Varanasi  initially assembled ALCO kits.  Subsequently, with technology transfer from GM EMD, it  produces advanced diesel locomotives with high efficiency and low maintenance costs. It produces around 240 locomotives annually.

Rail Coach Factory, Raebareli was inaugurated in 2012. It would initially produce 1,000 coaches per year and the capacity would be enhanced later.

Railway reorganisation
Around 1872, the Indian Branch Railway Company  was transformed into Oudh and Rohilkhand Railway. Oudh and Rohilkhand Railway was merged with East Indian Railway Company in 1925.

The Government of India took over the Bengal and North-Western Railway and merged it with the Rohilkhand and Kumaon Railway to form the Oudh and Tirhut Railway in 1943.

In 1952, Eastern Railway,  Northern Railway and North Eastern Railway were formed. Eastern Railway was formed with a portion of East Indian Railway Company, east of Mughalsarai and Bengal Nagpur Railway. Northern Railway was formed with a portion of East Indian Railway Company west of Mughal Sarai, Jodhpur Railway, Bikaner Railway and Eastern Punjab Railway. North Eastern Railway was formed with Oudh and Tirhut Railway, Assam Railway and a portion of Bombay, Baroda and Central India Railway. East Central Railway was created in 1996–97. North Central Railway was formed in 2003.

References

External links
 Trains at Varanasi
 Trains at Rae Bareli
 Trains at Lucknow Charbagh

5 ft 6 in gauge railways in India
Railway lines in Uttar Pradesh
Railway lines opened in 1898